Tricontinental is a quarterly left-wing magazine founded after the Tricontinental Conference in 1966.

Tricontinental, Tri-continental,  or Tri Continental may also refer to:

Tri Continental Film Festival, a film festival held in Cape Town, South Africa
Tri-Continental, a Canadian blues, folk and world music group
Tricontinental Conference (1966), a gathering of countries from Africa, Asia, and Latin America  that focused on anti-colonial and anti-imperial issues during the Cold War era
Tricontinental: Institute for Social Research, institute in India headed by Vijay Prashad

See also
Tricontinental Chile, a geopolitical concept denoting Chile's unique position with territory over three continents